People is a Canadian documentary television series which aired on CBC Television in 1955.

Premise
Topics featured in this series included neighbourhood life in Toronto's Chinatown and Rosedale areas, Montreal's Saint Joseph's Oratory, the development of the Saint Lawrence Seaway and a Toronto veterinary clinic.

Scheduling
This half-hour series was broadcast Saturdays at 7:00 p.m. from 9 July to 3 September 1955.

References

External links
 

CBC Television original programming
1950s Canadian documentary television series
1955 Canadian television series debuts
1955 Canadian television series endings
Black-and-white Canadian television shows